is a Japanese politician of the Democratic Party of Japan, a member of the House of Councillors in the Diet (national legislature). A native of Kamikawa, Hokkaidō and graduate of Nihon University, he was elected to the House of Councillors for the first time in 1995 as a member of the New Frontier Party.

References

External links 
  in Japanese.
 https://twitter.com/katsusikanai

Members of the House of Councillors (Japan)
Living people
1963 births
New Frontier Party (Japan) politicians
20th-century Japanese politicians
Democratic Party of Japan politicians
Nihon University alumni